Azumaya may refer to:

 (1920–2010), Japanese mathematician
Azumaya algebra
, mountain in Nagano Prefecture and Gunma Prefecture, Japan
An azumaya is a traditional arbour or summer pavilion found in formal Japanese gardens

Japanese-language surnames